The 1951 Chico State Wildcats football team represented Chico State College—now known as California State University, Chico—as a member of the Far Western Conference (FWC) during the 1951 college football season. Led by Paul J. Smith in his second and final season as head coach, Chico State compiled an overall record of 0–7 with a mark of 0–4 in conference play, placing last out of five teams in the FWC. The team was outscored by its opponents 214 to 53 for the season. The Wildcats played home games at Chico High School Stadium in Chico, California.

Smith finished his tenure at Chico State with an overall  a record of 2–13, for a .133 winning percentage. This is the worst winning percentage of any coach in Chico State Wildcats football history.

Schedule

Notes

References

Chico State
Chico State Wildcats football seasons
Chico State Wildcats football